Belleville station is a historic train station in Belleville, Wisconsin.

History
Built for Illinois Central Railroad, the depot serviced both passenger and freight trains. The depot stopped serving passenger trains in 1931 and freight trains in 1943. For a number of decades afterwards, the building was used by multiple parties to store grain.

Additionally, the depot has become a focal point of the Badger State Trail. The trail itself is made up of the former rail line the depot served, as the pathway was acquired by the Wisconsin Department of Natural Resources after rail operations ceased.

In 2016, it was added to the State and the National Register of Historic Places as the Belleville Illinois Central Railroad Depot.

References

Railway stations on the National Register of Historic Places in Wisconsin
National Register of Historic Places in Dane County, Wisconsin
Former Illinois Central Railroad stations
Former railway stations in Wisconsin
Italianate architecture in Wisconsin
Brick buildings and structures
Railway stations in the United States opened in 1888